Discoveries is the fifth studio album by the jazz pianist Josh Nelson. The album was released by Steel Bird Music on  September 6, 2011.

Track listing

Personnel
 Josh Nelson – piano, keyboard
 Dontae Winslow – trumpet, flugelhorn
 Alan Ferber – trombone
 Brian Walsh – bass clarinet
 Larry Koonse – guitar
 Dave Robaire – double bass, bass guitar
 Dan Schnelle – drums, percussion
 Vanessa Robaire – vocals

External links
Music Review: Josh Nelson - Discoveries - Blogcritics Music (dead link)
Something Else! Reviews - One Track Mind: Josh Nelson “Atma-Krandana” (2011)
Web archive of "@Critical Jazz: Josh Neslon Discoveries Steelbird Music 2011"
FAME Review: Josh Nelson - Discoveries

References 

Josh Nelson albums
2011 albums
Instrumental albums